Rakesh (Devnagari: राकेश) is a masculine given name of Indian origin. It is derived from the Sanskrit language.

Notable people with the given name

Chaudhary Rakesh Singh Chaturvedi, Indian politician 
Mohan Rakesh, literary movement activist
Rakesh Asthana, Indian Police Service officer of the 1984 batch of Gujarat cadre who served as the Special Director at the Central Bureau of Investigation, Police Commissioner of Delhi
Rakesh Bapat, Indian actor
Rakesh Bedi, Indian actor
Rakesh Gangwal, former CEO and chairman of US Airways Group
Rakesh Jhunjhunwala, Indian investor and trader
Rakesh Khurana, professor at Harvard Business School
Rakesh Kumar (kabaddi), Indian professional kabaddi player
Rakesh Madhavan, Malaysian cricketer
Rakesh Maria, Indian Police Service officer
Rakesh Masih, Indian international football player
Rakesh Patel, Indian cricketer
 Rakesh Pandey, Indian writer and author
Rakesh Roshan, Indian producer, director and actor
Rakesh Satyal, American novelist
Rakesh Sharma, first Indian in space
Rakesh Sharma (cricketer), Omani cricketer
Rakesh Sharma (filmmaker), Indian filmmaker
 Rakesh Singh (politician) (born 1962), Indian politician
 Rakesh Singh (soldier) (1970–1993), Indian Army soldier
Rakesh Yankaran, musician from Trinidad and Tobago
Rakesh Raxstar, British Punjabi rapper
Rakesh Bhuyan, Software Developer

References

Indian masculine given names